Horse Wood, Mileham is a  biological Site of Special Scientific Interest north-west of Dereham in Norfolk.

This is an ancient coppice with standards wood on boulder clay, and the ground flora is diverse with several rare species. There are wide and wet rides which have plants such as herb paris, valerian and water mint.

References

Sites of Special Scientific Interest in Norfolk